Mamiko Takai (高井麻巳子, Takai Mamiko, born December 28, 1966, in Obama, Fukui, Japan) is a Japanese idol from the eighties, who debuted in 1985 with the J-pop girl band Onyanko Club, and its first sub-group, duo Ushiroyubi Sasaregumi with her co-worker Yukiko Iwai. She quit those two bands in 1987, becoming a solo artist, and released four albums before marrying producer Yasushi Akimoto and subsequently retiring. Her older sister Masayo made her record debut in July 1986 as a part of a 20-member dance group named . She has two other younger sisters.

Biography 
Takai's family owned a local bike shop. After entering , she became popular among the students and was dubbed  (Jakkō is an abbreviation for Wakasa High School). At that time, she dreamed of becoming an actress in the future. After graduating from high school, she moved to Tokyo to attend Joshibi Junior College. On April 15, 1985, she was approached by Katsunobu Itō (伊藤克信, Itō Katsunobu), a reporter for the variety show , while she was shopping in Harajuku. This led to an audition for that show, which was accepted, and she became a member of Onyanko Club. Note that since she already was affiliated with an entertainment agency, some say that her being approached in Harajuku was a staged act disguised as a coincidence. She became a center of attention as soon as she joined Onyanko Club because she was considered a legitimate beauty. In October 1985, she teamed up with Yukiko Iwai and made their record debut as Ushiroyubi Sasaregumi. 

In June 1986, she made her solo debut with the song , which became number one on the Oricon chart in its first appearance. This song was very different from surrealistic novelty songs of Ushiroyubi Sasaregumi, and was a ballad with a calm and quiet tone. Since then, three more of her songs reached number one in a row. On July 6, 1986, a large-scale  was held at Osaka-jō Hall and she shook hands with 16,000 fans who gathered there. In October 1986, her radio program, was launched on Nippon Broadcasting System. In December 1986, Tōhō premiered the movie , in which she co-starred with Yuki Saitō and Haruko Sagara. In this film she played the role of a fun-loving disco queen. In reality, however, she had never been to a disco, and her character was considered to be sober and reserved, the opposite of a playful person, which made her role terribly perplexing to her fans. In April 1987, she graduated from Onyanko Club along with Sayuri Kokushō, Aki Kihara, Rika Tatsumi, and Kazuko Utsumi (内海和子, Utsumi Kazuko). Along with this, Ushiroyubi Sasaregumi also disbanded. She mentioned that Onyanko Club's first concert, held at Hibiya Open-Air Concert Hall in October 1985, was one of the most memorable events for her as a member of the group. 

She then became a solo singer and actress. She was oriented more toward acting than singing. In addition, she starred in the drama . In July 1987, she released two videos: a feature-length promotional video titled  filmed in Southern Europe and a video titled  featuring her first solo concert at NHK Hall in June of that year. She also published a photo book titled , taken in Southern Europe. On May 23, 1988, just three weeks after the official fan club was formed, she married Yasushi Akimoto and retired from the entertainment industry.

They then lived in New York for a year and a half. In March 2001, after 13 years of marriage, she finally had a baby girl. Moreover, in December 2002, she and her husband published a picture book titled . In October 2013, they invited Shinzō Abe, then Prime Minister, to their home and served him dinner. She also became an statutory auditor of Yasushi Akimoto's office.

Relationship with Yukiko Iwai 
She and Yukiko Iwai, who were partnered in Ushiroyubi Sasaregumi, were said by those around them to be not on good terms with each other. However, at least in the early days, it is considered otherwise. They often took a cab home together after appearing on Yūyake Nyan Nyan at the time, since they were going home in the same direction. When Ushiroyubi Sasaregumi disbanded, they both said that it was a very pleasant memory and that they loved this subgroup. Kazuji Kasai, chief director of Yūyake Nyan Nyan, supervisor of Onyanko Club, explained the relationship between the two as follows. "This subgroup was originally formed by our decision without regard to their wishes. So it is true that there were differences in orientation between the two, but they were not as incompatible as they were said to be." 

However, Iwai subsequently admitted on a TV program that she and Takai did not get along well. She mentioned that since they were in different groups, they spent little time together and had no conversations with each other outside of work. Iwai felt that Takai was privileged by Akimoto, which was also not amusing to her. Iwai made a curt comment about the successive marriages of Takai and Ruriko Nagata (永田ルリ子, Nagata Ruriko), saying that they should not have rushed into marriage since they were only 21 years old. Note that Eri Nitta, one of the most popular members of Onyanko Club, considered Takai to be one of her best friends. On the other hand, Takai herself recalled that when she was in Onyanko Club, there were no members she was particularly close to, and she was frequently alone.

Takai's characteristics and Yasushi Akimoto 
Many of Takai's fans interpreted her sudden marriage as Akimoto forcibly taking her away from them. Although they directed their uncontrollable anger toward Akimoto, sometimes even directly harassing him, they accepted this fact over time. In the summer of 1986, she was secretly being stalked by the paparazzi of the photo magazine Friday, which was brought to her attention by one of her most enthusiastic fans. She was also stalked by Akimoto when she and Aki Kihara went to see the movie Year of the Dragon at midnight. On this occasion, Akimoto approached Takai at the movie theater, feigning coincidence. On the other hand, actress Yuki Saitō, who admits to being Takai's close friend, In her collection of essays, she claimed that, contrary to popular perception, Takai was in fact actively courting Akimoto. He wrote many lyrics for the members of Onyanko Club, but only one song was written for her.

In addition, when Akimoto talked with her in the summer of 1986, he made the following comments about her. "She is naive because she was nurtured by the warm love of her family. Such characteristics of hers make her very clean image stand out in the greasy entertainment industry. While Sonoko Kawai and Eri Nitta will definitely have affairs, she will never commit adultery." In July 1985, when the members of Onyanko Club stayed at a hotel near  in Ōiso, Kanagawa, While all of them excitedly watched the pornographic videos, the "pure-hearted" Takai was the only one who was shocked into silence by them. She was considered by the members of Onyanko Club to be the most feminine of the group. Her plain, unassuming, ordinary manner was described as her greatest appeal. On the other hand, Akimoto and others described her as having an awkward and quirky side, despite her calm outward appearance.

Singles

Albums

Studio albums 
  (1987)
  (1987)
  (1988)
 Message (1988)

Compilation albums 
  series
  (2002)
  (2010)
  (2004)
  (2004)

Videos

Further reading

References

External links 
  Mamiko Takai on Idollica

Japanese women pop singers
Japanese idols
Living people
1966 births
People from Obama, Fukui
Onyanko Club
Yasushi Akimoto
Musicians from Fukui Prefecture